Following are the results of the 2004 Russian Premier League, the top division of Russian association football. Lokomotiv won their second Premier League title, while Krylya Sovetov finished in the top three for the first time, winning bronze. Kuban were relegated after just one season in the Premier League. They were joined by Rotor who played at the top level since the beginning of the Russian league.

Teams 
As in the previous season, 16 teams are playing in the 2004 season. After the 2003 season, Chernomorets Novorossiysk and Uralan Elista were relegated to the 2004 Russian First Division. They were replaced by Amkar Perm and Kuban Krasnodar, the winners and runners up of the 2003 Russian First Division.

Venues

Personnel and kits

Managerial changes

Standings

Results

Season statistics

Top goalscorers

See also 
 2004 in Russian football

References

External links 
 RSSSF

2004
1
Russia
Russia